Mount Eugene is the highest mountain of the United States Range on Ellesmere Island. Originally named "Mount Arthur Eugene" in 1883 by the States Army Signal Service during their Lady Franklin Bay expedition.

References
Geographical Names of the Ellesmere Island National Park Reserve and Vicinity by Geoffrey Hattersley-Smith (1998) 

Eugene, Mount
One-thousanders of Nunavut